The 1968 Nevada Wolf Pack football team represented the University of Nevada during the 1968 NCAA College Division football season. Nevada competed as a member of the Far Western Conference (FWC). The Wolf Pack were led by tenth-year head coach Dick Trachok, who resigned after the end of the season to take the job as athletic director. They played their home games at Mackay Stadium.

This was the Wolf Pack's last year as a member of the FWC as they went independent for the 1969 season.

Schedule

Personnel

References

Nevada
Nevada Wolf Pack football seasons
Nevada Wolf Pack football